"Love on a Farmboy's Wages" is a song written by Andy Partridge of the English rock band XTC, released as the third single from their 1983 album Mummer. It peaked at number 50 on the UK Singles Chart. Partridge wrote the song during the aftermath of the cancelled English Settlement tour. It features a key modulation from E to F# before its bridge. Drummer Terry Chambers left the band during rehearsals for the song. The single's cover art is a photograph of Partridge's actual wallet with the title embossed.

Music 
Ned Raggett called the song "a folk pop delight" which called to mind the period in which "Bert Jansch and Nick Drake had as much influence as Lennon and McCartney".

Personnel
XTC
Dave Gregory
Colin Moulding
Andy Partridge

Charts

Cover versions
 2007 – Fairport Convention, Sense of Occasion

References

External links
 "Love on a Farmboy's Wages" on Chalkhills

XTC songs
1983 singles
1983 songs
Virgin Records singles
Songs written by Andy Partridge
Black-and-white music videos